Azorilla is a small genus of sea snails, marine gastropod mollusks in the family Raphitomidae.

This genus has become a synonym of Teretia Norman, 1888.

Species
Species within the genus Azorilla include:
 Azorilla lottae (Verrill, 1885)
Species brought into synonymy
 Azorilla megalembryon (Dautzenberg & H. Fischer, 1896): synonym of Teretia megalembryon (Dautzenberg & Fischer, 1896)

References

  Beu, A.G. 2011 Marine Molluscs of oxygen isotope stages of the last 2 million years in New Zealand. Part 4. Gastropoda (Ptenoglossa, Neogastropoda, Heterobranchia). Journal of the Royal Society of New Zealand 41, 1–153

External links
  Bouchet, P.; Kantor, Y. I.; Sysoev, A.; Puillandre, N. (2011). A new operational classification of the Conoidea (Gastropoda). Journal of Molluscan Studies. 77(3): 273-308
 Ortega, J.; Gofas, S. (2019). The unknown bathyal of the Canaries: new species and new records of deep-sea Mollusca. Zoosystema.41(26): 513-551

 
Raphitomidae
Gastropod genera